Philipshill is an area of the Scottish new town East Kilbride, in South Lanarkshire.

Its borders are unclear and the area it encompasses is also often considered to be part of Peel Park.

The area features a garden centre, and Centre One - a Revenue and Customs call centre built as a replacement to the former building of the same name in East Kilbride's town centre.

Areas of East Kilbride